MEF International School (MEFIS) is a private international school in the Ortaköy district of Istanbul, Turkey. It was established in 1998 by Dr. Ibrahim Arikan. The enrollment is approximately 461 students of 52 nationalities from Preschool to Grade 12.

The MEFIS  curriculum is centered mainly around the Cambridge and IB Diploma Program.  MEFIS has an English program for students who come to the school with limited or no English skills.

History
MEFIS was founded in 1998 by Dr. Ibrahim Arikan, a Turkish entrepreneur and businessman who heads various companies grouped under Arikanli Holding Inc.

MEFIS was created to provide English language education at the Pre-school, Elementary school, Middle school and High school levels for the International Community based in Istanbul.

Curriculum
There are three separate curricula: Primary Years Program for Preschool-Grade 5, Cambridge for grades 6-8, IGCSE for grades 9,10 and IB Diploma/IB Certificate for grades 11,12.

 At MEFIS primary there are approximately 256 students representing at least 39 cultures.
 In middle school there is Cambridge curriculum for grades 6-8.
 The high school IB program started in 1998.

Science
The MEFIS science program uses the Cambridge program, which has an emphasis on human biology, and enables candidates to better understand the technological world in which they live, and take an informed interest in science and scientific developments. Candidates learn about the basic principles of biology through a mix of theoretical and practical studies. Chemistry and Physics are also sciences taught at MEFIS.

Arts
Throughout the year, students' artwork is showcased in ongoing art exhibits around the school. The end of the year MEFIS Annual Primary Art Exhibition is a favorite school event. Each child has a selected artwork on display for the community to appreciate and reflect upon. For secondary there is an Art Exhibition and an IB2 Exhibition.

Sports
MEFIS offers soccer, basketball, tennis, swimming, running, table tennis, dodge ball, handball, swimming gala, sports day, cross country run. The school has a swimming pool that is shared with the National School. There are 2 small gyms where the students normally do their P.E. and every week in primary we have 2 lessons and for secondary 2 periods on 1 day.

Library and technology
The MEFIS library provides curriculum support and meets the recreational reading needs for the whole school from Pre-School PYP program to the IB Diploma.

Student activities

Athletics
"Physical education in primary school is an integral part of the IB Primary Years Programme (IBPYP). Its purpose is to develop a combination of transferable skills promoting personal, social and physical development; to encourage present and help future choices that contribute to long-term healthy living; and to understand the cultural significance of physical activities for individuals and communities.

Students identify and develop appropriate skills and strategies when playing a variety of team games. These games vary from simple, organization games for the primary grades to football, basketball, and volleyball for the upper primary classes. Students recognize the importance of teamwork; identifying and developing appropriate skills and strategies; recognizing the importance of rules and how they define the nature of a game; modifying existing games and creating new games.

Clubs
The clubs for Primary are: Little Brainiacs, Ballet, Ceramics, Mad Science Sculpture, Lego, Construction, Modern dance, Modern Turkish Dance, Guitar/Piano, Movie Making, Flow Yoga, Chess, Running & Fitness, Fashion Design, Modern Dance/Tap, So Lets Sew, Film Club, Code Monkey, Violin, Green Club and Drama.

The clubs for Secondary are: International Culture Club, Community Service Club, Photography, Stained Glass, Sculpture, Rockets, World Cinema, Newspaper, MUN, Chess, Math Olympiad, Student Government, Ultimate Frisbee, Basketball, Animal Lovers, Football, Volleyball, Table Tennis, Code Monkey, Coding Computer, Short Movie and Photography.

People
In MEFIS, the population of students is around 256 students, with around 52 nationalities.

Faculty and staff
MEF's teachers are mostly American and Turkish.  The primary school, grades 1-5, is situated on the first three floors of the building and grades 6-12 are on the upper two floors. The primary school includes a primary assembly area where monthly assemblies are held, a computer lab, and whole school library, which houses a rich collection of books and electronic resources for students and families.

The secondary school also has a fully networked computer lab, chemistry, biology and physics laboratories, and canteen for purchasing small snack foods.

References

External links
The school's listing on the International Baccalaureate Site
Arikanli Holding
MEF International School in Izmir
MEF University
National School

International schools in Istanbul